The Big Sandy River is a tributary of the Ohio River, approximately  long, in western West Virginia and northeastern Kentucky in the United States. The river forms part of the boundary between the two states along its entire course.  Via the Ohio River, it is part of the Mississippi River watershed.

It is formed between Louisa, Kentucky, and Fort Gay, West Virginia, by the confluence of the Tug Fork and Levisa Fork. It flows generally northwardly in a highly meandering course, between Lawrence and Boyd counties in Kentucky and Wayne County in West Virginia.

The river is navigable and carries commercial shipping, primarily coal mined in the immediate region.

The name of the river comes from the presence of extensive sand bars. The Native American names for the river included Tatteroa, Chatteroi, and Chatterwha. The name "Big Sandy" was in use no later than February, 1789.  The tombstone of David White, an early settler along the river in Kentucky, marks his passing in 1817 with the note that he lived many years near the Mouth of the Big Sandy.

Two well-known fiddle tunes take their name from the Big Sandy River: "Sandy River Belle" and the "Big Sandy River". Loretta Lynn's "Van Lear Rose" and Dwight Yoakam's "Bury Me" also mention the river.

The river also plays a major role in the Hatfield-McCoy feud.

Some Native American Tribes have links to the area and region, like the Tutelo, Issa, Cherokee and others.

Martin County sludge spill
On October 11, 2000, the Martin County sludge spill polluted hundreds of miles of the Ohio River, the Big Sandy River and its tributaries.  The accident was caused when a coal sludge impoundment owned by Massey Energy in Kentucky broke into an abandoned underground mine below.  Toxic pollutants including heavy metals such as mercury, lead, arsenic, copper and chromium were found in the sludge that spilled into these waterways.

The spill was 30 times larger than the Exxon Valdez oil spill and one of the worst environmental disasters ever in the southeastern United States, according to the U.S. Environmental Protection Agency.

See also

List of Kentucky rivers
List of West Virginia rivers
Little Sandy River
Port of Huntington Tri-State

References

External links
University of Kentucky: Big Sandy Basin assessment

Rivers of Kentucky
Rivers of West Virginia
Tributaries of the Ohio River
Borders of Kentucky
Borders of West Virginia
Rivers of Wayne County, West Virginia
Rivers of Boyd County, Kentucky
Rivers of Lawrence County, Kentucky